Lucius Caecilius Metellus Diadematus was the second son of Roman politician and general Quintus Caecilius Metellus Macedonicus.

During his consulship in 117 BC he supported the development of roads in Italy and he probably built Via Caecilia. A year later he was Proconsul of Cisalpine Gaul. In 115 BC Diadematus was elected Censor and during his censorship with Gnaeus Domitius Ahenobarbus they expelled 32 senators from the Senate.

He was an opponent of Lucius Appuleius Saturninus and was arrested in 100 BC with Saturninus and other senators when Saturninus tried to forcefully oppose the Senate.

He lived to see the return of his first cousin, Quintus Caecilius Metellus Numidicus, from exile, and exerted himself to obtain his recall.

See also
 Caecilia gens

Notes

References 

2nd-century BC Roman consuls
Diadematus, Lucius
Optimates
Roman censors
Year of birth unknown
Year of death unknown